Zimný Stadion Banská Bystrica is an indoor ice hockey arena in Banská Bystrica, Slovakia.

The arena, opened in 1956, seats 3,000 people, and is home to HC 05 Banska Bystrica.

Notable events
An overview of some sport events:

1977
1977 IIHF World Under-20 Championship

References

External links
Profile on hockeyarenas.net

Indoor ice hockey venues in Slovakia
Buildings and structures in Banská Bystrica
Sport in Banská Bystrica Region